The 2015–16 Sacramento State Hornets men's basketball team represented California State University, Sacramento during the 2015–16 NCAA Division I men's basketball season. The Hornets were led by eighth year head coach Brian Katz and played their home games at Colberg Court. They were members of the Big Sky Conference. They finished the season 14–17, 6–12 in Big Sky play to finish in tenth place. They defeated Montana State in the first round of the Big Sky tournament to advance to the quarterfinals where they lost to Montana.

Previous season
The Hornets finished the season 21–12, 13–5 in Big Sky play to finish in a tie for third place. They advanced to the semifinals of the Big Sky tournament where they lost to Eastern Washington. They were invited to the CollegeInsider.com Tournament where they defeated Portland in the first round before losing in the second round to fellow Big Sky member Northern Arizona.

Departures

2015 incoming recruits

2016 incoming recruits

Roster

Schedule

|-
!colspan=9 style="background:#004840; color:#B39650;"| Exhibition

|-
!colspan=9 style="background:#004840; color:#B39650;"| Non-conference regular season

|-
!colspan=9 style="background:#004840; color:#B39650;"| Big Sky regular season

|-
!colspan=9 style="background:#004840; color:#B39650;"|  Big Sky tournament

References

Sacramento State Hornets men's basketball seasons
Sacramento State